Colonia Noche Buena is a neighborhood in Benito Juárez, Mexico City.

"Noche Buena" literally means "good night", but is also the Spanish name for Christmas Eve. The name comes from Compañía Ladrillera de la Noche Buena, a brickworks from the 19th century that was located in the lands that now belong to the Parque Hundido and the Colonia Noche Buena.

Location
Colonia Noche Buena is located in the Benito Juárez municipality of Mexico City.

The neighborhood is bordered by:

Eje 6 Sur Holbein on the north, across which is Ciudad de los Deportes
Augusto Rodin street on the west, across which is Colonia San Juan
Porfirio Díaz Avenue on the south, across which is Colonia Extremadura Insurgentes
Avenida de los Insurgentes Sur on the east, across which is Colonia Insurgentes San Borja and Colonia del Valle Centro

Description
Colonia Noche Buena is mainly a residential neighborhood consisting of apartment buildings and houses that date back to the 1950s, though some of this buildings have been demolished and replaced by modern apartment buildings. The neighborhood has, also, a few small cafés and restaurants.

Similarly to adjacent Ciudad de los Deportes and Colonia Nápoles, Noche Buena's street nomenclature corresponds to cities and states of the United States, such as Baltimore, Florida, Carolina and Cleveland, to name a few.

A house that belonged to Octavio Paz is located in the neighborhood. Mexico City's government has planned to transform it into a public library and cultural space.

Transportation

Public transportation
The area is served by the Mexico City Metrobús Line 1 and EcoBici bikeshare.

<P>Metrobús stations
  Parque Hundido

References

Benito Juárez, Mexico City